The Rally Fighter is an American automobile manufactured by Local Motors and introduced in 2009. It is the first car to be developed using co-creation design. The exterior design was submitted by Sangho Kim and selected through community votes. The Rally Fighter is street legal in all 50 states.

Specifications 

Power goes to the rear wheels through a 4-speed GM 4L85-E automatic transmission. The suspension features double A-arms up front and a 4-link Ford 9-inch axle in the rear, both using coil springs and telescopic shock absorbers. This gives it 16 inches of suspension travel in the front and 20 inches in the rear. It also features a fiberglass body to save weight. In the interior, the Rally Fighter is equipped with standard 3-point harness seat belts, a full roll cage and Recaro seats, as well as amenities such as air conditioning, stereo and power windows.

Build process 
The Rally Fighter used an assembly process where the buyer of the car went to one of Local Motors' micro-factories to assemble their car with help from a team of Local Motors employees. This also allowed the Rally Fighter to be titled as a kit car or component car in the United States. The Rally Fighter is street legal in all 50 states and upwards of 50 cars have been produced.

Crowd sourcing 
The Rally Fighter is an open-source vehicle. The Rally Fighter is believed to be the first production vehicle designed through crowd-sourcing, the process of drawing input from a global community of interested people via the Internet. The winning design was submitted by Sangho Kim of Pasadena, California, and is inspired by a P-51 Mustang fighter plane. It was chosen through a vote in 2009 by a community of people on the Internet. Using this method, the car was developed from start to finish in 18 months.

References

External links
 

2010s cars
Cars introduced in 2009
Cars of the United States
Crowdsourcing
Front mid-engine, rear-wheel-drive vehicles
Off-road vehicles
Open hardware vehicles